Dublin City School District may refer to:

Dublin City School District (Ohio)
Dublin City School District (Georgia)